Manuel Bernabeu (13 January 1920 – 19 May 2015) was a Spanish modern pentathlete. He competed at the 1948 Summer Olympics.

References

External links
 

1920 births
2015 deaths
Spanish male modern pentathletes
Olympic modern pentathletes of Spain
Modern pentathletes at the 1948 Summer Olympics
Sportspeople from Barcelona